Blue-foot or blue foot can refer to any of three unrelated mushroom species:

 Clitocybe nuda, commonly known as the wood blewit
 Hydnellum cyanopodium
 Psilocybe caerulipes